Callionymus kailolae, Kailola's deepwater dragonet or the Northwestern ocellated dragonet, is a species of dragonet native to the Indian Ocean off of western Australia where this deep-water species is found at depths of from .  The specific name honours Patricia Kailola of Newnham, Tasmania who published a photograph of the new species, "in appreciation of her interest in callionymid fish research".

References

K
Fish described in 2000
Taxa named by Ronald Fricke